This Time is the fourth solo studio album released by English singer Melanie C. It was primarily released on 30 March 2007 in Germany, Austria and Switzerland. It was released in United Kingdom and some other countries on 2 April. The album features the singles "I Want Candy", "The Moment You Believe", "Carolyna", "This Time" and "Understand", and sold over 300,000 copies worldwide.

Background
This Time was written and recorded throughout the second half of 2006 and early 2007 and released on Chisholm's own record label, Red Girl Records.

The songs "What If I Stay" and "Don't Let Me Go" are cover versions of two songs originally written and recorded by Speedway lead singer Jill Jackson for her debut solo album.

Two leftover tracks from the album; "Blue Skies All the Way" and "Paris Burning" would be released two years later on Chisholm's live DVD "Live at the Hard Rock Cafe".

Critical reception

This Time garnered mixed reception from music critics who were divided by the lyrical content feeling nondescript. Glenn Meads of the Manchester Evening News praised the album's tracks for showcasing Chisholm's new found maturity and consistent genre versatility in her voice, concluding that its "perfect for anyone fed up with Melua, Jones and other artists who sleep walk their way through each track. At least Melanie sounds like she means it." Talia Kraines of BBC commended the album for having tracks that allowed Chisholm's voice to show emotion but that it will only appeal to long-time fans than attract new ones. AllMusic's Stephen Thomas Erlewine gave credit to the sleek production and Chisholm's voice showing character and maturity but found the songs too middling and subpar to notice them yet. Despite praising Chisholm's vocal performance and her duet with Adam Argyle, John Murphy of MusicOMH found songs "bland and forgettable" and lacked personality to give it life, concluding that "[I]t's a shame, but this album won’t be the one to propel a Spice Girl back to the top of the charts."

Track listing

Personnel

Melanie C – vocals
Luke Potashnick – guitar
Steve Pearce – bass guitar
Joel Edwards – guitar, additional backing vocals
Ian Thomas – drums
Guy Chambers – keyboards, piano, synthesizer
Mark Richardson – drums
Robin Barter – keyboards, bass guitar
Chris Laws – percussion
James Bourne – piano
Trevor Barry – bass guitar
Ben Lee – violin
Steve Mac – piano, synthesizer
Greg Hatwell – acoustic guitar, electric guitar
Phil Thornalley – guitar, backing vocals, mellotron, bass guitar
David Munday – bass guitar
Simon Clarke – saxophone
Charlie Grant – acoustic guitar, bass guitar, electric guitar
Mark Evans – guitar
Roddy Lorimer – trumpet
Pete Woodroffe – keyboards, drum programming
Paul Gendler – acoustic guitar, electric guitar
Peter John Vettese – piano, programming
Scott Firth – bass guitar
Ian Burdge – cello
Vinnie Lammi – drums
Nick Nasmyth – keyboards
Charlotte Aggett – backing vocals
Lizzy Pattinson – backing vocals

Charts

Certifications and sales

Release history

References

2007 albums
Albums produced by Stephen Hague
Melanie C albums
Self-released albums